Coleophora cinclella is a moth of the family Coleophoridae. It is found on Honshu island of Japan.

The wingspan is about 13 mm.

References

cinclella
Moths described in 1990
Moths of Japan